Sananda TV (Bengali:সানন্দা টিভি) was a 24-hour Bengali General Entertainment Channel owned by ABP Group. It was launched on 25 July 2011. However, it was shut down on 7 November 2012.

Programs broadcast by Sananda TV
Note : Some programs might have not been included.

Jeet
Alpo Alpo Premer Galpo
Amar Naam Joyeeta
Ami Sei Mey
Bengali Movie (This program showed several Bengali films)
Bindi (A soap opera on two girls' life who are poles apart from each other)
Bhola Maheshwar (A mythological and spiritual drama on Lord Shiva's life)
Josh
Mrs Sinha Roy (Aired on the 2030 HRS (IST) slot. The show was aborted inadvertently)
Nader Nemai (A mythological and spiritual drama on Chaitanya Mahaprabhu or Nemai)
Nayika (second successful show after Bindi ended abruptly for financial reasons)
Proloy Asche (A 50-episode daily serial directed and produced by noted Bengali film director Raj Chakraborty aired on Mon-Fri at 2200 HRS (IST) slot)
Rannabati (Cookery show)
Sobinoy Nibedon (A drama based on the situation after a Marwari girl marries a Bengali boy)
Ta Bole Ki Prem Debo Na
Jabab Kinte Chai

Closure
Sananda TV shut down 15 months after its launch on 7 November 2012.

See also
ABP Group
Sananda
ABP Ananda

References

Television channels and stations established in 2011
Television channels and stations disestablished in 2012
ABP Group
Television stations in Kolkata
2011 establishments in West Bengal
2012 disestablishments in India